Black-bridged leaf turtle may refer to:

 Western black-bridged leaf turtle (Cyclemys atripons), an Asian leaf turtle found in Cambodia, East Thailand, and Vietnam
 Eastern black-bridged leaf turtle (Cyclemys pulchristiata), an Asian leaf turtle found in Eastern Cambodia and Vietnam

See also
 Asian leaf turtles, turtles belonging to the genus Cyclemys.